Afioga Masoe Tulele was a Western Samoan chief and politician. He served as a member of the Legislative Assembly from 1948 to 1954, and again from 1964 to 1967.

Biography
When the Legislative Assembly was established in 1948, Tulele was chosen to represent Vaisigano by the three Fautua (high chiefs). He was re-elected in 1951, but lost his seat in the 1954 elections.

He returned to the Legislative Assembly after winning the Vaisigano No. 1 seat in the 1964 elections, defeating future Prime Minister Va'ai Kolone by six votes. He did not contest the 1967 elections, and was succeeded by Kolone.

References

Samoan chiefs
Members of the Legislative Assembly of Samoa